The WNBL Leading Rebounder Award is an annual Women's National Basketball League (WNBL) statistical award given since the 2020 WNBL season.  

The Leading Rebounder is determined by the player with the highest average rebounds per game, throughout the regular season. To be eligible, players must have played in at least 50% of games played in the season. Prior to 2020, there was no award for leading the league in rebounds, only the statistical accolade.

Winners

See also 
 WNBL Leading Scorer Award
 WNBL Golden Hands Award
 WNBA Peak Performers
 WNBL Defensive Player of the Year Award
 All-WNBL Team

References 

Leading Rebounder
Awards established in 1981